The Sino-Soviet border conflict was a seven-month undeclared military conflict between the Soviet Union and China in 1969, following the Sino-Soviet split. The most serious border clash, which brought the world's two largest communist states to the brink of war, occurred in March 1969 near Zhenbao (Damansky) Island on the Ussuri (Wusuli) River in Manchuria. Clashes also took place in Xinjiang. 

The conflict resulted in a Soviet victory. A ceasefire was declared and led to a return to the status quo.

Background

History
Under the governorship of Sheng Shicai (1933–1944) in Northwest China's Xinjiang Province, China's Kuomintang recognized for the first time the ethnic category of a Uyghur people by following the Soviet ethnic policy. That ethnogenesis of a "national" people eligible for territorialized autonomy broadly benefited the Soviet Union, which organized conferences in Fergana and Semirechye (in Soviet Central Asia) to cause "revolution" in Altishahr (southern Xinjiang) and Dzungaria (northern Xinjiang).

Both the Soviet Union and the White Movement covertly allied with the Ili National Army to fight the Kuomintang in the Three Districts Revolution. Although the mostly-Muslim Uyghur rebels participated in pogroms against Han Chinese generally, the turmoil eventually resulted in the replacement of Kuomintang rule in Xinjiang with that of the Chinese Communist Party.

Soviet historiography, more specifically "Uyghur Studies," was increasingly politicized to match the tension of the Sino-Soviet split of the 1960s and the 1970s. One Soviet Turkologist, Tursun Rakhminov, who worked for the Soviet Communist Party, argued that the modern Uyghurs had founded the ancient Toquz Oghuz Country (744–840), the Kara-Khanid Khanate (840–1212), and so forth. The premodern states' wars against Chinese dynasties were cast as struggles for national liberation by the Uyghur ethnic group. Soviet historiography was not consistent on those issues; when Sino-Soviet relations were warmer, for example, the Three Districts Revolution was portrayed by Soviet historians as part of opposition to the Kuomintang during the Chinese Civil War, not as an anti-Chinese bid for national liberation. The Soviets also encouraged migration of Uyghurs to its territory in Kazakhstan, along the 4,380 km (2,738 mi) border. In May 1962, 60,000 Uyghurs from Xinjiang Province crossed the frontier into the Soviet Union to flee the famine and economic chaos of the Great Leap Forward.

Amid heightening tensions, the Soviet Union and China began border talks. Although the Soviet Union had granted all of the territory of the Japanese puppet state of Manchukuo to the Chinese Communists in 1945, which decisively assisted them during the Chinese Civil War, the Chinese now indirectly demanded territorial concessions on the basis that the 19th-century treaties transferring ownership of the sparsely-populated Outer Manchuria, concluded by Qing dynasty China and the Russian Empire, were "Unequal Treaties" and amounted to the annexation of rightful Chinese territory. Moscow would not accept that interpretation, but by 1964, both  sides had reached a preliminary agreement on the eastern section of the border, including Zhenbao Island, which would be handed over to China.

In July 1964, CCP Chairman Mao Zedong, in a meeting with the Japanese Socialist Party delegation, stated that Russia had unilaterally incorporated vast territories in Siberia and the Far East as far as Kamchatka. He stated that China and Russia still had not resolved this issue. The comments were leaked to the public. Outraged, Soviet Premier Nikita Khrushchev refused to approve the border agreement.

Geography
In 1892, the Russian Empire and the Qing Dynasty had agreed that the border would consist of the ridge of the Sarikol Range, but the exact border remained contentious throughout the 20th century. In the 1960s, the Chinese began to insist that the Soviet Union evacuate the region.

From around 1900, after the Treaty of Peking (1860) had assigned Outer Manchuria (Primorskiy Kray) to Russia, the eastern part of the Sino-Soviet border had mainly been demarcated by three rivers, the Argun River from the tripartite junction with Mongolia to the north tip of China, running southwest to northeast, then the Amur River to Khabarovsk from northwest to southeast, where it was joined by the Ussuri River running south to north. "The modern method (used for the past 200 years) of demarcating a river boundary between states today is to set the boundary at either the median line (ligne médiane) of the river or around the area most suitable for navigation under what is known as the 'thalweg principle'".

There is nothing in either the 1858 or the 1860 treaty to suggest the border is anywhere other than the thalweg. In 1861, at a meeting to further define the border, Petr Kazakevich, chief Russian boundary commissioner, persuaded or coerced his Chinese opposite to accept and sign a small-scale map (less than 1:1,000,000) that he presented as giving expression to the terms of the Treaty of Peking. Where that treaty had left the Amur and Ussuri as boundary rivers and therefore as shared international waterways, Kazakevich's map made them exclusively Russian by marking the international boundary along the Chinese banks. The text of the Treaty of Peking explicitly runs the boundary through the Amur/Ussuri confluence, but the line on Kazakevich's map takes a different route at that point. The rivers draw together at an oblique angle, creating a delta of land between them, but some thirty miles short of the point that  their main currents merge, a minor channel connects the rivers, cartographically making an island of the land between the rivers. Kazakevich drew his boundary along this channel, thus making inland waterways of the river stretches between the mouths of the channel and the confluence, and making the inter-connecting channel itself a boundary feature. 

Kazakevich's grateful government named the channel after him (the Chinese call it the Fuyuan Channel). The notional island thus created what the Russians call Great Ussuri, the Chinese Heixiazi, the word signifying a bear, so henceforth, “Bear Island.” In due course, the Russians began depicting Kazakevich's version of the boundary on their maps, and over the years, authoritative European cartographers came to follow suit. From the early 1920s, Bear Island was occupied by Soviet citizens, coming with time to be regarded as an offshore development of Khabarovsk.

China claimed the islands, as they were on the Chinese side of the river if they were demarcated according to international law by using shipping lanes. The Soviets claimed and already effectively controlled almost every island along the rivers.

Russia and subsequently the Soviet Union claimed all the islands in both rivers including those that were Chinese according to the thalweg principle. In the 1991 treaty, Russia largely conceded that tse islands were Chinese, but Bolshoy Ussuriysky Island, at the confluence of the Amur and the Ussuri Rivers, had become part of the Russian city of Khabarovsk, and China agreed that about two thirds of the island should remain Russian.

Chinese and Soviet governments' views
The Soviets had possessed nuclear weapons for a longer time than the Chinese and so the Chinese adopted an asymmetric deterrence strategy that threatened a large conventional people's war in response to a Soviet counterforce nuclear first strike. Chinese numerical superiority was the basis of its strategy to deter a Soviet nuclear attack. Since 1949, Chinese strategy, as articulated by Mao, emphasized the superiority of "man over weapons". Although weapons were certainly an important component of warfare, Mao argued that they were "not the decisive factor; it is people, not things, that are decisive. The contest of strength is not only a contest of military and economic power, but also a contest of human power and morale." To Mao, "non-material" factors like "creativity, flexibility and high morale" were also "critical determinants in warfare'.

The Soviets were not confident that they could win such a conflict. A large Chinese incursion could threaten strategic centers in Blagoveshchensk, Vladivostok, and Khabarovsk as well as crucial nodes of the Trans-Siberian Railroad. According to Arkady Shevchenko, a high-ranking Soviet defector to the United States, "The Politburo was terrified that the Chinese might make a mass intrusion into Soviet territory". A nightmare vision of invasion by millions of Chinese made the Soviet leaders almost frantic: "Despite our overwhelming superiority in weaponry, it would not be easy for the USSR to cope with an assault of this magnitude". China's "vast population and deep knowledge and experience in guerrilla warfare" would nearly certainly cause the Soviets' launching of an attack on China's nuclear program to end in both states being "mired in an endless war".

Concerns about Chinese manpower and its people's war strategy ran so deep that some bureaucrats in Moscow argued that the only way to defend against a massive conventional onslaught was to use nuclear weapons. Some even advocated deploying nuclear mines along the Sino-Soviet border. By threatening to initiate a prolonged conventional conflict in retaliation for a nuclear strike, Beijing used an asymmetric deterrence strategy that was intended to convince Moscow that the costs of an attack would outweigh the benefits.

China had found its strategic rationale. While most Soviet military specialists did not fear a Chinese nuclear reprisal and believed that China's arsenal was too small, rudimentary, and vulnerable to survive a first strike and to carry out a retaliatory attack, China's massive conventional army caused great concern.

Nikolai Ogarkov, a senior Soviet military officer, believed that a massive nuclear attack "would inevitably mean world war." Even a limited counterforce strike on China's nuclear facilities was dangerous, Ogarkov argued, because a few nuclear weapons would "hardly annihilate" a country the size of China, which, in response,  would "fight unrelentingly".

Eastern border: Heilongjiang (1969)
The Soviet Border Service started to report an intensifying Chinese military activity in the region in the early 1960s. Tensions at first built slowly, but the Cultural Revolution made them rise much faster. The number of troops on both sides of the Sino-Soviet border increased dramatically after 1964. Militarily, in 1961, the Soviets had 225,000 men and 200 aircraft at the border. In 1968, there were 375,000 men, 1,200 aircraft and 120 medium-range missiles. China had 1.5 million men stationed at the border and had tested its first nuclear weapon (the 596 Test in October 1964, at Lop Nur basin). Both sides' political rhetoric was increasingly hostile.

The key moment in escalating Sino-Soviet tensions was the Soviet invasion of Czechoslovakia on 20–21 August 1968 and the proclamation of the Brezhnev Doctrine that the Soviets had the right to overthrow any communist government that was diverging from what was defined by the Kremlin. Mao saw the Brezhnev Doctrine as the ideological justification for a Soviet invasion of China to overthrow him and launched a massive propaganda campaign attacking the invasion of Czechoslovakia, although he had condemned the Prague Spring as "revisionism". On 21 August 1968, the Romanian leader, Nicolae Ceaușescu, gave a speech in Revolution Square in Bucharest that denounced the invasion of Czechoslovakia. It was widely seen both in Romania and abroad as virtual declaration of independence from the Soviet Union. Romania began to move away from the Soviet sphere of influence, towards the Chinese sphere of influence.

Speaking at a banquet held at the Romanian embassy in Beijing on 23 August 1968, Zhou Enlai denounced the Soviet Union for "fascist politics, great power chauvinism, national egoism and social imperialism." He went on to compare the invasion of Czechoslovakia to the Americans in the Vietnam War and more pointedly to the policies of Adolf Hitler towards Czechoslovakia in 1938 to 1939. Zhou ended his speech with a barely veiled-call for the people of Czechoslovakia to wage guerrilla war against the Red Army.

The Chinese historian Li Danhui wrote, "Already in 1968, China began preparations to create a small war on the border." She noted that prior to March 1969, the Chinese troops had twice attempted to provoke a clash along the border, "but the Soviets, feeling weak, did not accept the Chinese challenge and retreated." Another Chinese historian, Yang Kuisong, wrote, "There were already significant preparations in 1968, but the Russians did not come, so the planned ambush was not successful."

Battle of Zhenbao (Damansky) Island 

On 2 March 1969, a group of People's Liberation Army troops ambushed Soviet border guards on Zhenbao Island. According to Chinese sources, the Soviets suffered 58 dead, including a senior colonel, and 94 wounded. The Chinese losses were reported as 29 dead. According to Soviet (and now Russian) sources, at least 248 Chinese troops were killed on the island and on the frozen river, and 32 Soviet border guards were killed, with 14 wounded.

Both sides have since  blamed the other for the start of the conflict. However, a scholarly consensus has emerged that the border crisis had been a premeditated act of aggression orchestrated by the Chinese side. The American scholar Lyle J. Goldstein noted that Russian documents released since the glasnost era paint an unflattering picture of the Red Army command in the Far East with senior generals surprised by the outbreak of the fighting and of Red Army units haphazardly committed to action in a piecemeal style, but all of the documents speak of the Chinese as the aggressors. Even most Chinese historians now agree that on 2 March 1969, Chinese forces planned and executed an ambush, which took the Soviets completely by surprise. The reasons for the Chinese leadership to opt for such an offensive measure against the Soviets remains a disputed question.

The Chinese claim a different version of the conflict. The Cultural Revolution increased tensions between China and the Soviets, which led to brawls between border patrols. On 27 December 1968, several Soviet armored vehicles landed on Zhenbao Island, and Soviet soldiers used sticks to beat Chinese soldiers. On 23 January 1969, another violent conflict occurred on the island, and 28 Chinese soldiers were reportedly wounded. From 6 to 25 February 1969, five more similar incidents occurred, and shooting broke out in March 1969. According to the Chinese version of events, at 8:40 a.m. on the 2 March 1969, 30 Chinese border patrol personnel split into two groups approached the island and were met by about 70 Soviet soldiers along with one truck and reinforced with two armoured vehicles attempting to encircle the Chinese patrol. The Chinese claim the Soviets had opened fire at 9:17. The Soviets responded with tanks, armoured personnel carriers (APCs), and artillery bombardment. Over three days, the PLA successfully halted Soviet penetration and eventually evicted all Soviet troops from Zhenbao Island. During the skirmish, the Chinese deployed two reinforced infantry platoons with artillery support. Chinese sources state the Soviets deployed some 60 soldiers and six BTR-60 amphibious APCs, and in a second attack, some 100 troops backed up by 10 tanks and 14 APCs including artillery. The PLA had prepared for that confrontation for two to three months.

From among the units, the Chinese selected 900 soldiers commanded by army staff members with combat experience. They were provided with special training and special equipment and were secretly dispatched to take position on Zhenbao Island in advance. Chinese General Chen Xilian stated the Chinese had won a clear victory on the battlefield.

 By the end of the day, Soviet General Oleg Losik ordered to deploy then-secret BM-21 "Grad" multiple rocket launchers. The Soviets fired 10,000 artillery rounds in a nine-hour engagement with the Chinese along with 36 sorties.
The attack was devastating for the Chinese troops and materials. The Chinese troops left their positions on the island, and the Soviets withdrew to their positions on the Russian bank of the Ussuri River.

On 16 March 1969, the Soviets entered the island to collect their dead, with the Chinese holding their fire. On 17 March 1969, the Soviets tried to recover a disabled T-62 tank from the island, but their effort was repelled by Chinese artillery.

On 21 March, the Soviets sent a demolition team in an attempt to destroy the tank. The Chinese opened fire and thwarted the Soviet attempt. With the help of divers from the Chinese navy, the PLA pulled the T-62 tank onshore. The tank was later given to the Chinese Military Museum. 

Until 1991, the island remained contested.

Soviet combat heroes

Five Soviet soldiers were awarded the top honour of Hero of the Soviet Union for bravery and valor during the Damansky conflict. Colonel Demokrat Leonov led the group of four T-62 tanks in a counterattack on 15 March and was killed by a Chinese sniper when he was leaving a destroyed vehicle. Senior Lieutenant Ivan Strelnikov tried to negotiate a peaceful withdrawal of the Chinese commandos from the island and was killed while he was talking to the enemy.

Senior Lieutenant Vitaly Bubenin led a relief mission of 23 soldiers from the nearby border guards outpost and conducted a BTR-60 raid into the Chinese rear that allegedly left 248 attackers dead. Junior Sergeant Yuri Babansky assumed command in a battle on 2 March, when the enemy had a 10-1 superiority, and when Senior Lieutenant Strelnikov was killed. Babansky later led combat search-and-rescue teams, which retrieved the bodies of Strelnikov and Leonov. Junior Sergeant Vladimir Orekhov took part in the 15 March battle. As a machine gunner, he was part of the first attacking line against the Chinese forces encamped on the island. He destroyed the enemy machine gun nest and was wounded twice, but he continued to fight until he died of his wounds. High military orders of Lenin, the Red Banner, the Red Star and Glory were awarded to 54 soldiers and officers, and the medals "For Courage" and "For Battle Merit" to 94 border guards and servicemen.

Diplomacy
On 17 March 1969, an emergency meeting of the Warsaw Pact was called in Budapest by Brezhnev with the aim of condemning China. The meeting turned acrimonious, as Romania's Nicolae Ceaușescu refused, despite considerable Soviet pressure, to sign the statement condemning China. Ceaușescu's intransigence led to no statement being issued, which was widely seen as a Soviet diplomatic defeat. The next day, a meeting of the delegations representing 66 communist parties in Moscow discussed the preparations for a world summit in Moscow on 5 June 1969. A Soviet motion to condemn China failed, with the delegations representing the communist parties of Romania, Italy, Spain, Switzerland and Austria all supporting the Chinese position that it was the Soviet Union that had attacked China, rather than vice versa.

On 21 March 1969, Soviet Premier Alexei Kosygin tried to phone Mao with the aim of discussing a ceasefire. The Chinese operator who took Kosygin's call rather rudely, called him a "revisionist element" and hung up. Zhou, who wanted to take up Kosygin's ceasefire offer, was shocked by what he regarded as Mao's recklessness: "The two countries are at war, one cannot chop the messenger." Diplomats from the Soviet embassy in Beijing spent much of 22 March in vain trying to get hold of Mao's private phone number so that Kosygin could call him to discuss peace. On 22 March 1969, Mao had a meeting with the four marshals who commanded the Chinese troops in the border regions with the Soviet Union to begin preparations for a possible all-out war. Zhou repeatedly urged Mao to discuss a ceasefire but agreed with Mao's refusal to take phone calls from Kosygin. In an effort to placate Zhou, Mao told him, "Immediately prepare to hold diplomatic negotiations."

Between 1 and 24 April 1969, the 9th Congress of the Chinese Communist Party took place, and Mao officially proclaimed the end of the Great Proletarian Cultural Revolution, which he had begun in May 1966. Despite the official end of the Cultural Revolution, the Congress elected to key positions followers of the ultraleftist factions associated with Mao's powerful wife, Jiang Qing, and Defense Minister Lin Biao. Both Jiang and Lin favored a hard line towards the Soviet Union.

Meanwhile, Mao had ordered preparations for a "defense in depth" along the border because real fears had arisen of the border crisis escalating into all-out war. On 1 May 1969, in a bid to repair China's image abroad, which had been badly damaged by the Cultural Revolution, Mao invited diplomats from several Third World nations to attend the May Day celebrations in Beijing. To the assembled diplomats, Mao formally apologized for the attacks by the Red Guards on diplomats in China and the smashing up of the embassies in Beijing in 1967. Mao claimed not to be aware of the fact that the xenophobic Red Guard had been beating up and sometimes killing foreigners living in China during the Cultural Revolution. Also, Mao announced that for the first time since the Cultural Revolution, he would send out ambassadors to represent China abroad (most Chinese ambassadors had been recalled and executed during the Cultural Revolution with no replacements having been  sent). By then, Mao had felt that China's isolation caused by the Cultural Revolution had become a problem since China was now on the brink of a war with the Soviet Union.

On 5 May 1969, Kosygin traveled to India, which was strongly against China, to discuss with Prime Minister Indira Gandhi the possibility of a Soviet-Indian alliance against China. Between 14 and 19 May 1969, Nikolai Podgorny visited North Korea to try to pull Kim Il-sung away from the Chinese orbit. Kim declined to move away from China, and in a show of support for Mao, North Korea sent no delegation to the world conference of communist parties that was held in Moscow in June 1969.

On 17 June 1969, US Senate Majority Leader Mike Mansfield, who had long been an advocate of normalizing American relations with China, wrote a letter, in consultation with the White House, that urged him allowed to visit China and to meet with Mao to discuss measures to improve Sino-American relations. The letter was sent to King Norodom Sihanouk of Cambodia with the request to pass it on to Mao, and by 26 July 1969, Mansfield's letter had arrived in Beijing. The Chinese reply was harsh, with Zhou giving a speech accusing the US of "aggression" in Vietnam and of "occupation" of Taiwan, which Zhou asserted was rightfully a part of China. On 1 August 1969, US President Richard Nixon visited Pakistan, a close ally of China since both were anti-Indian, to ask General Yahya Khan to pass a message to Mao that he wanted to normalize relations with China, especially due to the crisis with the Soviet Union.

On 2–3 August 1969, Nixon visited Romania to meet with Ceaușescu and ask him to pass along the same message to Mao. Ceaușescu agreed to do so, and on 7 September 1969, Romanian Prime Minister Ion Gheorghe Maurer, who was in Hanoi to attend the funeral of Ho Chi Minh, took Zhou aside to tell him that Nixon wanted an opening to China.

Western border: Xinjiang (1969)

Further border clashes occurred in August 1969, which is now along the western section of the Sino-Soviet border in Xinjiang. After the Tasiti and the Bacha Dao Incidents, the Tielieketi Incident finally broke out, with Chinese troops suffering 28 losses. The heightened tensions raised the prospect of an all-out nuclear exchange between China and the Soviet Union.

Ho Chi Minh's funeral
The decisive event that stopped the crisis from escalating into all-out war was the death of Ho Chi Minh on 2 September 1969. His funeral was attended by both Zhou and Kosygin, albeit at different times. Zhou flew out of Hanoi to avoid being in the same room as Kosygin. The possibility of North Vietnam's leading supporters going to war with each other alarmed the North Vietnamese. During the funeral, messages were exchanged between the Soviets and the Chinese via the North Vietnamese. Meanwhile, Nixon's message via Maurer had reached the Chinese, and it was decided in Beijing to "whet the appetite of the Americans" by making China appear stronger. 

Zhou argued that a war with the Soviets would weaken China's hand towards the United States. The Chinese were more interested in the possibility of a rapprochement with the United States as a way of acquiring Taiwan than in having the United States ally with them against the Soviet Union. After Kosygin had attended Ho's funeral, the airplane taking him back to Moscow was denied permission to use Chinese air space, which forced it to land for refuelling in Calcutta. In India, Kosygin received the message via the Indian government that the Chinese were willing to discuss peace, which caused him to fly back to Beijing instead.

Assessment

State of near war 
In the early 1960s, the United States had "probed" the level of Soviet interest in joint action against Chinese nuclear weapons facilities; now the Soviets probed what the US reaction would be if the Soviets attacked the facilities. Noting that "neither side wishes the inflamed border situation to get out of hand," the Central Intelligence Agency in August 1969 described the conflict as having "explosive potential" in the President's Daily Briefing. The agency stated that "the potential for a war between them clearly exists," including a Soviet attack on Chinese nuclear facilities, and China "appears to view the USSR as its most immediate enemy."

As war fever gripped China, Moscow and Beijing took steps to lower the danger of a large-scale conflict. On 11 September 1969, Kosygin, on his way back from the funeral of Ho Chi Minh, stopped over in Beijing for talks with his Chinese counterpart, Zhou Enlai. Symbolic of the frosty relations between the two communist countries, the talks were held at Beijing Airport. Both agreed to return ambassadors who had been recalled and to begin border negotiations. On September 23 and 29 of 1969, China conducted two unannounced nuclear weapons tests, with the second one a 3 MT thermonuclear device, to verify its nuclear strike capacity.

Possible reasons for attack 
The view on the reasoning and consequences of the conflict differ. Western historians believe that the events at Zhenbao Island and the subsequent border clashes in Xinjiang were caused mainly by Mao's use of Chinese local military superiority to satisfy domestic political imperatives in 1969. Yang Kuisong concludes that "the [Sino-Soviet] military clashes were primarily the result of Mao Zedong's domestic mobilization strategies, connected to his worries about the development of the Cultural Revolution."

Russian historians point out that the consequences of the conflict stem directly from a Chinese desire to take a leading role in the world and to strengthen ties with the United States. According to the 2004 Russian documentary film, Damansky Island Year 1969,  Mao sought to elevate his country from the world's periphery and to place it at the centre of world politics. Other analysts state that the Chinese intended their attack on Zhenbao to deter future Soviet invasions by demonstrating that China could not be "bullied."

Aftermath 
Seen against the background of the Strategic Arms Limitation Talks between Brezhnev and Nixon, the Damansky incident could serve the double purpose of undermining the Soviet image of a peaceloving country if the Soviets chose to respond by a massive military operation against the invaders. If they demonstrated Soviet weakness, the Chinese attack could have been left without response. The killing of Soviet servicemen on the border signaled to the US that China had graduated into high politics and was ready to talk.

After the conflict, the US showed interest in strengthening ties with the Chinese government by secretly sending Henry Kissinger to China for a meeting with Zhou in 1971, during the so-called Ping Pong Diplomacy. That paved the way for Nixon to visit China and meet with Mao in 1972.

Sino-Soviet relations remained sour after the conflict, despite the border talks, which began in 1969 and continued inconclusively for a decade. Domestically, the threat of war caused by the border clashes inaugurated a new stage in the Cultural Revolution: China's thorough militarization. The 9th National Congress of the Chinese Communist Party, held in the aftermath of the Zhenbao incident, confirmed Defense Minister Lin Biao as Mao's heir apparent. Following the events of 1969, the Soviets further increased their forces along the Sino-Soviet border and in the Mongolian People's Republic.

Overall, the Sino-Soviet confrontation, which reached its peak in 1969, paved the way to a profound transformation in the international political system.

Border negotiations: 1990s–2000s

Serious border demarcation negotiations did not occur until shortly before the fall of the Soviet Union in 1991. In particular, both sides agreed that Zhenbao belonged to China. (Both sides claimed the island to be under their control at the time of the agreement.) On 17 October 1995, an agreement over the last  stretch of the border was reached, but the question of control over three islands in the Amur and Argun rivers was left to be settled later.

In a border agreement between Russia and China signed on 14 October 2003, the final dispute was resolved. China was granted control over Tarabarov Island (Yinlong Island), Zhenbao Island, and around 50% of Bolshoy Ussuriysky Island (Heixiazi Island), near Khabarovsk. The Standing Committee of the National People's Congress ratified the agreement for China on 27 April 2005, and the Russian Duma followed suit on 20 May. On 2 June, foreign Minister of China, Li Zhaoxing and his Russian counterpart, Sergei Lavrov, exchanged the ratification documents from their respective governments.

On 21 July 2008, Chinese Foreign Minister Yang Jiechi and his Russian counterpart, Lavrov, signed an additional Sino-Russian Border Line Agreement, marking the acceptance of the demarcation of the eastern portion of the Chinese-Russian border in Beijing, China. An additional protocol with a map affiliated on the eastern part of the borders both countries share was signed. The agreement also includes the Chinese gain of ownership of Yinlong / Tarabarov Island and half of Heixiazi / Bolshoi Ussuriysky Island.

In the 21st century, the Chinese Communist Party's version of the conflict, which is present on many official websites, describes the events of March 1969 as a Soviet aggression against China.

In popular culture
 The map-based war game "The East is Red: the Sino-Soviet War" (based on a hypothetical war using publicly-known orders of battle on either side) was published with an accompanying article in issue No. 42 of Strategy and Tactics magazine by Simulations Publications, Inc. in 1974.
 Wargame: Red Dragon features a hypothetical war between both powers based on the border conflict.
 Graviteam Tactics: Operation Star features a general depiction of the combat in its DLC Zhalanaskol 1969.
 The 1971 post-apocalyptic film The Omega Man is set in a world following a border conflict that involves both powers using biological warfare, which cause a pandemic.
 Andrei Tarkovsky's film, Mirror (1975), includes actual footage of unrest from the Sino-Soviet border conflict setting.
 The 2006 zombie apocalypse novel World War Z features a Chinese doctor who served as a combat medic during the Sino-Soviet border conflict serving as a key narrator, being the first responder to patient zero of the zombie plague in a rural Chinese village.
 The fourth season of the streaming series Stranger Things, references Damansky. The character Yuri fought and defeated the Chinese at the island.

See also
 History of the Soviet Union (1964–1982)
 History of the People's Republic of China
 Foreign relations of China
 Soviet invasion of Xinjiang
 Islamic rebellion in Xinjiang (1937)
 Battle of Baitag Bogd

References

Sources

Further reading 
 Olgin, Vladimir. On the Soviet-Chinese Border: Questions and Answers. Novosti Press Agency Publishing House, 1978.
Ryabushkin and Orenstein, The Sino-Soviet Border War of 1969 Volume 2: Confrontation at Lake Zhalanashkol August 1969, Helion & Co., 2021.

External links

Damansky Island Incident Part 1 (English Subtitles) YouTube
Map showing some of the disputed areas
Sino-Soviet Border Conflict, 1969
How Comrade Mao was perceived in the Soviet Union
The Sino-Soviet Border Conflict: Deterrence, Escalation, and the Threat of Nuclear War in 1969
New Documents on the Sino-Soviet Ussuri Border Clashes of 1969

Conflicts in 1969
1969 in China
1969 in the Soviet Union
China–Soviet Union relations
Cold War military history of the Soviet Union
Cold War military history of China
Military history of Manchuria
History of the Russian Far East
Wars involving the People's Republic of China
Wars involving the Soviet Union
Territorial disputes of China
Territorial disputes of the Soviet Union
China–Soviet Union border
China–Russia border